The Tibetan snowfinch or Henri's snowfinch (Montifringilla henrici) is a species of bird in the sparrow family.

It is found in Tibet. Its natural habitat is high altitude dry shrubland. It is sometimes considered a subspecies of the white-winged snowfinch.

References

Clements, J. F., T. S. Schulenberg, M. J. Iliff, B.L. Sullivan, C. L. Wood, and D. Roberson. 2012. The eBird/Clements checklist of birds of the world: Version 6.7. Downloaded from 

Tibetan snowfinch
Birds of Tibet
Endemic fauna of Tibet
Tibetan snowfinch
Taxa named by Émile Oustalet